Kalmiopsis leachiana, commonly referred to as kalmiopsis, is a rare flowering plant endemic to the Siskiyou Mountains of southwest Oregon, where it is specially protected in the  Kalmiopsis Wilderness reserve.  It was discovered in 1930 by Lilla Leach in the Gold Basin area.

It is related to Kalmia in the family Ericaceae.

Description

The flowers are pink-purple, in racemes of 6-9 together, reminiscent of small Rhododendron flowers but flatter, with a star-like calyx of five conjoined petals; each flower is 1.5–2 cm diameter. The fruit is a five-lobed capsule, which splits to release the numerous small seeds.

References

External links

NRCS: USDA Plants Profile Kalmiopsis leachiana (Kalmiopsis), OR: 
Rogue River-Siskiyou National Forest - Kalmiopsis Wilderness
Guide to the Lilla Leach papers at the University of Oregon
Kalmiopsis leachiana | survival in a land of extremes
The Nature Conservancy: Kalmiopsis leachiana

Ericoideae
Flora of Oregon
Flora of the Klamath Mountains
Endemic flora of the United States
~
Plants described in 1932
Endemic flora of Oregon